The Missouri Historical Review is an academic journal of history established 1906, published by the State Historical Society of Missouri and concerning the history and history related topics of the State of Missouri. It also published reviews of books on or relating to Missouri history.

See also 
 

History of the United States journals
Publications established in 1906
Quarterly journals
English-language journals
1906 establishments in Missouri